DJ-Kicks: Booka Shade is a DJ mix album, mixed by Booka Shade. It was released on the Studio !K7 independent record label as part of the DJ-Kicks series.

Track listing
 "A Different Kind Of Blue" - Passengers
 "Slum Girl" - Nôze
 "In The Smoke" - Cerrone / "Hang Around" (Wahoo Dub) - Ben Westbeech
 "The Bank Robbery" - John Carpenter
 "Estoril" - Booka Shade
 "Situation" (US 12" remix) - Yazoo
 "The Misida Monarchy" - Akiko Kiyama / "The Things I Saw" - Karel Fialka
 "2 Fast 4 U" - Lopazz
 "Play Your Part" - Quarion
 "Arrival At The Library" - John Carpenter / "Far Away" - Mile Caro & Franck Garcia
 "Alberto Balsam" - Aphex Twin
 "Geisha Boys And Temple Girls" - Heaven 17
 "Drums" - The Tubes
 "Contact" - Brigitte Bardot
 "Numbers" - Booka Shade
 "Karasu" - Quarion
 "It's Too Late" - The Streets
 "Virtual Nature" - Amir Ad Fontes
 "Landcruising" - Carl Craig
 "Tide" - Matthew Dear
 "Don & Sherri" (Hot Chip Remix) - Matthew Dear
 "Last Orders" - Richard Hawley

References 
 DJ-Kicks website

Booka Shade
Booka Shade albums
2007 compilation albums